Re Yeovil Glove Co Ltd [1965] Ch 148 is a leading UK insolvency law case, concerning voidable floating charges for past value. It holds that a floating charge can harden (or crystallise) when it secures a debt in an overdraft account, when the bank keeps the facility open as a company takes money out and puts money in.

Facts
The liquidator of Yeovil Glove Co Ltd, a glove manufacturer in Yeovil, sued National Provincial Bank to rescind a floating charge taken within 12 months before insolvency. The bank's floating charge was to secure Yeovil Glove's overdraft, which (on top of debts of £94,000 to other unsecured creditors) had grown to £67,000 when the bank took fixed security and then as money was still unpaid, a floating charge. Over the next year, Yeovil Glove paid £111,000 and drew out (through cheques written to other people that the bank was honouring) £110,000. At the time the Insolvency Act 1986, section 245 (formerly Companies Act 1948, section 322) read that a floating charge was voidable ‘except to the amount of any cash paid to the company at the time of or subsequently to the creation of, and in consideration for, the charge.’ The bank argued that because more money had been paid out of the account than was covered by the charge (albeit that new debts were run up) the charge was not voidable. As in Clayton's case, money going into an account is presumed to discharge the last debt first. So money had been advanced to the company to a greater extent than the charge, and the turnover of money converted the old value given into new value.

Plowman J held that the ability to make drawings after was good consideration for the charge.

Judgment
Harman LJ noted the liquidator’s argument, that because no cash or promise to pay cash was made when the debenture was made, there was no consideration except the bank’s immediate forbearance. But he held that the act of the bank in meeting the company’s cheques was equivalent to money given, relying partly on a decision by Romer J in Re Thomas Mortimer Ltd. By the rule in Clayton’s case, the bank could claim the whole £67,000 was cash advanced subsequently to the creation of the charge, so the security was valid. His judgment went as follows

See also

UK insolvency law

Notes

References

United Kingdom insolvency case law
1965 in British law
1965 in case law
High Court of Justice cases